WGIT (1660 AM, Lighthouse Radio) is a radio station broadcasting a Spanish Religious format. It is licensed to Canovanas, Puerto Rico, and is owned by International Broadcasting Corporation. it is operated through License Management agreement by Faro de Santidad, Inc. from Vega Baja, Puerto Rico. The station is shared with translator station W266CF 101.1 FM in San Juan, which is owned by Aurio A. Matos Barreto.

History

WGIT originated as the expanded band "twin" of an existing station on the standard AM band. On March 17, 1997 the Federal Communications Commission (FCC) announced that 88 stations had been given permission to move to newly available "Expanded Band" transmitting frequencies, ranging from 1610 to 1700 kHz, with WCHQ in Camuy authorized to move from 1360 to 1660 kHz. The construction permit for the expanded band station on 1660 AM was assigned the call letters WGIT on December 14, 2000. WGIT later moved to Canovanas and the station signed on the air on July 27, 2001.

An FCC policy for expanded band authorizations was that both the original station and its expanded band counterpart could operate simultaneously for up to five years, after which owners would have to turn in one of the two licenses, depending on whether they preferred the new assignment or elected to remain on the original frequency. On December 24, 2003, after 33 years on the air, WCHQ on 1360 AM went silent and shut down, and on April 5, 2004 its license was cancelled and the call sign deleted from its database by the FCC.

Translator stations

References

External links

GIT
Canóvanas, Puerto Rico
Radio stations established in 2001
2001 establishments in Puerto Rico
2004 disestablishments in Puerto Rico
Radio stations disestablished in 2004